Soosi is a 1969 Indian Malayalam film, directed and produced by Kunchacko. The film stars Prem Nazir, Sharada, Adoor Bhasi and Hari in the lead roles. The film had musical score by G. Devarajan.

Cast

Prem Nazir as Rajan
Sharada as Susie
Adoor Bhasi as Dallal Lazar
Hari as George
Manavalan Joseph as Supervisor
P. J. Antony as Ouseppachan
Sreelatha Namboothiri as Jolly
Alummoodan as Thaaraavukaaran
G. Gopinath as Income Tax Officer
Kaduvakulam Antony as Clerk
Kottarakkara Sreedharan Nair as Chacko Sir
N. Govindankutty as Driver Kutty
Raghavan Nair as Joy
S. P. Pillai as Thomachan

Soundtrack
The music was composed by G. Devarajan and the lyrics were written by Vayalar Ramavarma.

References

External links
 

1969 films
1960s Malayalam-language films